The 1991 NCAA Division II men's basketball tournament involved 32 schools playing in a single-elimination tournament to determine the national champion of men's NCAA Division II college basketball as a culmination of the 1990-91 NCAA Division II men's basketball season. It was won by the University of North Alabama and Bridgeport's Lambert Shell was the Most Outstanding Player.

Regional participants

*denotes tie

Regionals

New England - Worcester, Massachusetts 
Location: Andrew Laska Gymnasium Host: Assumption College

Third Place - Merrimack 89, Assumption 71

East - Slippery Rock, Pennsylvania 
Location: Morrow Field House Host: Slippery Rock University of Pennsylvania

Third Place - Slippery Rock 119, Shippensburg 101

South Central - Warrensburg, Missouri 
Location: CMSU Fieldhouse Host: Central Missouri State University

Third Place - Kentucky Wesleyan 91, West Texas State 78

West - Bakersfield, California 
Location: CSUB Student Activities Center Host: California State University, Bakersfield

Third Place - UC Riverside 90, Chico State 82

North Central - Grand Forks, North Dakota 
Location: Hyslop Sports Center Host: University of North Dakota

Third Place - Metro State 99, Nebraska–Kearney 92

South Atlantic - Charlotte, North Carolina 
Location: Brayboy Gymnasium Host: Johnson C. Smith University

Third Place - Johnson C. Smith 102, Morehouse 89

South - Troy, Alabama 
Location: Sartain Hall Host: Troy State University

Third Place - Hampton 70, Florida Southern 68

Great Lakes - Ashland, Ohio 
Location: Kates Gymnasium Host: Ashland University

Third Place - Bellarmine 94, Missouri Western State 83

*denotes each overtime played

Elite Eight - Springfield, Massachusetts
Location: Springfield Civic Center Hosts: American International College and Springfield College

*denotes each overtime played

All-tournament team
 Pat Morris (Bridgeport)
 Lambert Shell (Bridgeport)
 Fred Stafford (North Alabama)
 Allen Williams (North Alabama)
 Carl Wilmer (North Alabama)

References
 1991 NCAA Division II men's basketball tournament jonfmorse.com

External links
 NCAA record book

NCAA Division II men's basketball tournament
Tournament
NCAA Division II basketball tournament
NCAA Division II basketball tournament